The 1981 Team Ice Racing World Championship was the third edition of the Team World Championship. The final was held on 7/8 February, 1981 in Inzell, Germany.

Classification

See also 
 1981 Individual Ice Speedway World Championship
 1981 Speedway World Team Cup in classic speedway
 1981 Individual Speedway World Championship in classic speedway

References 

Ice speedway competitions
World